Al-Sawda and Al Issa Wahi is a sub-district located in the Al Bayda District, Al Bayda Governorate, Yemen. Al-Sawda and Al Issa Wahi had a population of 3851 according to the 2004 census.

References 

Sub-districts in Al Bayda District